Julia Stockton Dinsmore (March 6, 1833 – April 19, 1926) was an American poet best remembered for her association with the Dinsmore Homestead in Kentucky, now on the National Register of Historic Places and a museum open to the public.

Biography
She was born in Terrebonne Parish, Louisiana, the daughter of Martha Macomb and James Dinsmore. At the age of nine, she moved to Boone County, Kentucky, where she resided for the rest of her life.

As a child, Julia was tutored at home until she was about sixteen years old, when she was sent to the Seminary for Young Ladies in Cincinnati, taught by Margaret Coxe, author of The Young Lady's Companion. She particularly enjoyed writing poetry and sent poems to be printed in the Times-Democrat of New Orleans. In 1910 Doubleday, Page & Company published a collection of these under the title, Verses and Sonnets.<ref>Julia Stockton Dinsmore. Verses and Sonnets'. New York:  Doubleday, Page & Co., 1910.</ref>

While Julia Dinsmore never married, when her older sister, Isabella Dinsmore Flandrau died in 1867, Julia raised her two nieces, Patty and Sally, with financial help from the girls' father, Charles E. Flandrau. Following the death of her father, James Dinsmore, she inherited the Boone farm and continued to manage it until her death in 1926.

She faithfully kept a journal for most of this time, giving insight into the life of a woman who lived and wrote during a time of momentous changes for the United States and for women.

Notes

 References 
Margaret Coxe. The Young Lady's Companion:  In a Series of Letters. Columbus, Ohio: Isaac N. Whiting, 1840.
Hannah Hume Baird. "Julia Dinsmore." In Kentucky Women: Two Centuries of Indomitable Spirit and Vision''. Edited by Eugenia K. Potter. Louisville: Four Color Imports, 1997.

1833 births
1926 deaths
People from Terrebonne Parish, Louisiana
People from Boone County, Kentucky
Farmers from Kentucky
American diarists
American women poets
Women diarists
Kentucky women in agriculture
American women non-fiction writers
19th-century American poets
19th-century American women writers
20th-century American poets
20th-century American non-fiction writers
20th-century American women writers
Poets from Louisiana
Poets from Kentucky
Farmers from Louisiana